Cybernetics is a wide-ranging field concerned with circular causal processes such as feedback. Norbert Wiener named the field after an example of circular causal feedback - that of steering a ship where the helmsman adjusts their steering in response to the effect it is observed as having, enabling a steady course to be maintained amongst disturbances such as cross-winds or the tide.

Cybernetics is concerned with circular causal processes however they are embodied, including in ecological, technological, biological, cognitive and social systems and also in the context of practical activities such as designing, learning, managing, etc. Its transdisciplinary character has meant that cybernetics intersects with a number of other fields, leading to it having both wide influence and diverse interpretations.

Definitions 
Cybernetics has been defined in a variety of ways, reflecting "the richness of its conceptual base". One of the most well known definitions is that of Norbert Wiener who characterised cybernetics as concerned with "control and communication in the animal and the machine". Another early definition is that of the Macy cybernetics conferences, where cybernetics was understood as the study of "circular causal and feedback mechanisms in biological and social systems". Margaret Mead emphasised the role of cybernetics as "a form of cross-disciplinary thought which made it possible for members of many disciplines to communicate with each other easily in a language which all could understand".

Other definitions include: "the art of governing or the science of government" (André-Marie Ampère); "the art of steersmanship" (Ross Ashby); "the study of systems of any nature which are capable of receiving, storing, and processing information so as to use it for control" (Andrey Kolmogorov); "a branch of mathematics dealing with problems of control, recursiveness, and information, focuses on forms and the patterns that connect" (Gregory Bateson); "the art of securing efficient operation" (Louis Couffignal); "the art of effective organization." (Stafford Beer); "the science or the art of manipulating defensible metaphors; showing how they may be constructed and what can be inferred as a result of their existence" (Gordon Pask); "the art of creating equilibrium in a world of constraints and possibilities" (Ernst von Glasersfeld); "the science and art of understanding" (Humberto Maturana); "the ability to cure all temporary truth of eternal triteness" (Herbert Brun); "a way of thinking about ways of thinking (of which it is one)" (Larry Richards);

Etymology 

According to Norbert Wiener, the word cybernetics was coined by a research group involving himself and Arturo Rosenblueth in the summer of 1947. It has been attested in print since at least 1948 through Wiener's book Cybernetics: Or Control and Communication in the Animal and the Machine. In the book, Wiener states:

Moreover, Wiener explains, the term was chosen to recognize James Clerk Maxwell's 1868 publication on feedback mechanisms involving governors, noting that the term governor is also derived from κυβερνήτης (kubernḗtēs) via a Latin corruption gubernator. Finally, Wiener motivates the choice by steering engines of a ship being "one of the earliest and best-developed forms of feedback mechanisms".

Independently, the French term cybernétique was used in 1834 by André-Marie Ampère in Essai sur la philosophie des sciences to describe the science of civil government.

Feedback

Feedback is a process where the observed outcomes of actions are taken as inputs for further action in ways that support the pursuit and maintenance of particular conditions or their disruption, forming a circular causal relationship. In steering a ship, where the helmsperson maintains a steady course in a changing environment by adjusting their steering in continual response to the effect it is observed as having. Other examples of circular causal feedback include: technological devices such as thermostats (where the action of a heater responds to measured changes in temperature, regulating the temperature of the room within a set range); biological examples such as the coordination of volitional movement through the nervous system; and processes of social interaction such as conversation.

History

Precursors

The Ancient Greek term κυβερνητικης (kubernētikēs, '(good at) steering') appears in Plato's Republic and Alcibiades, where the metaphor of a steersman is used to signify the governance of people. The French word cybernétique was also used in 1834 by the physicist André-Marie Ampère to denote the sciences of government in his classification system of human knowledge.

The first artificial automatic regulatory system was a water clock, invented by the mechanician Ktesibios; based on a tank which poured water into a reservoir before using it to run the mechanism, it used a cone-shaped float to monitor the level of the water in its reservoir and adjust the rate of flow of the water accordingly to maintain a constant level of water in the reservoir. This was the first artificial truly automatic self-regulatory device that required no outside intervention between the feedback and the controls of the mechanism. Devices constructed by Ktesibios and others such as Hero of Alexandria, Philo of Byzantium, and Su Song, are early examples of cybernetic principles in action.

In the late 18th century James Watt's steam engine was equipped with a governor, a centrifugal feedback valve for controlling the speed of the engine. In 1868, James Clerk Maxwell published a theoretical article on governors, one of the first to discuss and refine the principles of self-regulating devices. Jakob von Uexküll applied the feedback mechanism via his model of functional cycle (Funktionskreis) in order to explain animal behaviour and the origins of meaning in general. Electronic control systems originated with the 1927 work of Bell Telephone Laboratories engineer Harold S. Black on using negative feedback to control amplifiers. In 1935 Russian physiologist P. K. Anokhin published a book in which the concept of feedback ("back afferentation") was studied. Other precursors include: Alexander Bogdanov's tektology, Scottish philosopher Kenneth Craik and Romanian physician Ștefan Odobleja.

First wave

The initial focus of cybernetics was on parallels between regulatory feedback processes in biological and technological systems. Two foundational articles were published in 1943: "Behavior, Purpose and Teleology" by Arturo Rosenblueth, Norbert Wiener, and Julian Bigelow –based on the research on living organisms that Rosenblueth did in Mexico–; and the paper "A Logical Calculus of the Ideas Immanent in Nervous Activity" by Warren McCulloch and Walter Pitts. In the early 1940s John von Neumann contributed a unique and unusual addition to the world of cybernetics: von Neumann cellular automata, and their logical follow up, the von Neumann Universal Constructor, leading to the concept of self-replication, which cybernetics adopted as a core concept.

The foundations of cybernetics were then developed through a series of transdisciplinary conferences funded by the Josiah Macy, Jr. Foundation, between 1946 and 1953. The conferences were chaired by McCulloch and had participants included Ross Ashby, Gregory Bateson, Heinz von Foerster, Margaret Mead, John von Neumann, and Norbert Wiener. In the UK, similar focuses were explored by the Ratio Club, an informal dining club of young psychiatrists, psychologists, physiologists, mathematicians and engineers that met between 1949 and 1958.

In the spring of 1947, Wiener was invited to a congress on harmonic analysis, held in Nancy organized by the Bourbaki and mathematician Szolem Mandelbrojt. During this stay in France, Wiener received the offer to write a manuscript on the unifying character of this part of applied mathematics. The following summer, back in the United States, Wiener decided to introduce the neologism cybernetics, coined to denote the study of "teleological mechanisms", into his scientific theory: it was popularized through his book Cybernetics: Or Control and Communication in the Animal and the Machine.

During the 1950s, cybernetics was developed as a primarily technical discipline. For instance, in 1954, Qian Xuesen's published work "Engineering Cybernetics" was the basis of science in segregating the engineering concepts of Cybernetics from the theoretical understanding of Cybernetics as described so far historically. In the Soviet Union, Cybernetics was initially considered with suspicion. However, in the mid to late 1950s Viktor Glushkov and others salvaged the reputation of the field, incorporating much of what became known as computer science in the West.

By the 1960s and 1970s, however, cybernetics' transdisciplinarity fragmented, with technical focuses separating into separate fields. Artificial intelligence (AI) was founded as a distinct discipline at the Dartmouth workshop in 1956, differentiating itself from the broader cybernetics field. After some uneasy coexistence, AI gained funding and prominence. Consequently, cybernetic sciences such as the study of artificial neural networks were downplayed. Similarly, computer science became defined as a distinct academic discipline in the 1950s and early 1960s.

Second wave 

The second wave of cybernetics came to prominence from the 1960s onwards, with its focus inflecting away from technology towards social, ecological, and philosophical concerns. It was still grounded in biology, notably Maturana and Varela's autopoiesis, and built on earlier work on self-organising systems and the presence of anthropologists Mead and Bateson in the Macy meetings. The Biological Computer Laboratory, founded in 1958 and active until the mid-1970s under the direction of Heinz von Foerster at the University of Illinois at Urbana–Champaign, was a major incubator of this inflection in cybernetics' research programme.

Focuses of the second wave of cybernetics included management cybernetics, such as Stafford Beer's biologically inspired viable system model; work in family therapy, drawing on Bateson; social systems, such as in the work of Niklas Luhmann; epistemology and pedagogy, such as in the development of radical constructivism. Cybernetics' core theme of circular causality was developed beyond goal-oriented processes to concerns with reflexivity and recursion. This was especially so in the development of second-order cybernetics (or the cybernetics of cybernetics), developed and promoted by Heinz von Foerster, which focused on questions of observation, cognition, epistemology, and ethics.

The 1960s onwards also saw cybernetics begin to develop exchanges with the creative arts, design, and architecture, notably with the Cybernetic Serendipity exhibition (ICA, London, 1968), curated by Jasia Reichardt, and the unrealised Fun Palace project (London, unrealised, 1964 onwards), where Gordon Pask was consultant to architect Cedric Price and theatre director Joan Littlewood.

Third wave 
From the 1990s onwards, there has been a renewed interest in cybernetics from a number of directions. Early cybernetic work on artificial neural networks has been returned to as a paradigm in machine learning and artificial intelligence. The entanglements of society with emerging technologies has led to exchanges with feminist technoscience and posthumanism. Re-examinations of cybernetics' history have seen science studies scholars emphasising cybernetics' unusual qualities as a science, such as its "performative ontology". Practical design disciplines have drawn on cybernetics for theoretical underpinning and transdisciplinary connections.

Emerging topics include how cybernetics' engagements with social, human, and ecological contexts might come together with its earlier technological focus, whether as a critical discourse or a "new branch of engineering".

Key concepts and theories

Double bind theory

Double binds are patterns created in interaction between two or more parties in ongoing relationships where there is a contradiction between messages at different logical levels that creates a situation with emotional threat but no possibility of withdrawal from the situation and no way to articulate the problem. While the theory was first described by Gregory Bateson and colleagues in the 1950s with regard to the origins of schizophrenia, it is also characteristic of many other social contexts.

Ecological aesthetics

Gregory Bateson saw the world as a series of systems containing those of individuals, societies and ecosystems. Each of these systems has adaptive changes which depend upon feedback loops to control balance by changing multiple variables. He saw the natural ecological system as innately good as long as it was allowed to maintain homeostasis, and that the key unit of survival in evolution was an organism and its environment.

Bateson, in this subject, presents western epistemology as a method of thinking that leads to a mindset in which man exerts an autocratic rule over all cybernetic systems and in doing so he unbalances the natural cybernetic system of controlled competition and mutual dependency. Bateson claims that humanity will never be able to control the whole system because it does not operate in a linear fashion, and if humanity creates his own rules for the system, he opens himself up to becoming a slave to the self-made system due to the non-linear nature of cybernetics. Lastly, man's technological prowess combined with his scientific hubris gives him the potential to irrevocably damage and destroy the "supreme cybernetic system" (i.e. the biosphere), instead of just disrupting the system temporally until the system can self-correct.

Second order cybernetics

Second-order cybernetics, also known as the cybernetics of cybernetics, is the recursive application of cybernetics to itself and the practice of cybernetics according to such a critique. It is cybernetics where "the role of the observer is appreciated and acknowledged rather than disguised, as had become traditional in western science". It has seen development of cybernetics in relation to family therapy, the social sciences, the creative arts, design research, and philosophy. It is associated with Margaret Mead, Heinz von Foerster, the Biological Computer Laboratory, and the American Society for Cybernetics.

Second order cybernetics overlaps with radical constructivism, an approach to epistemology developed initially by Ernst von Glasersfeld.

A central concern in second-order cybernetics is self-reference. An example of a self-referential system explored in second-order cybernetics is that of an eigenform, which plays an important role in the work of Heinz von Foerster and is "inextricably linked with second order cybernetics".

The critique of objectivity developed in second-order cybernetics led to a concern with ethical issues. Foerster developed a critique of morality in ethical terms, arguing for ethics to remain implicit in action. Foerster's position has been described as an "ethics of enabling ethics" or as a form of "recursive ethical questioning". Varela published a short book on "ethical know-how". Glanville identified a number of "desirable" ethical qualities implicit in the cybernetic devices of the black box, distinction, autonomy, and conversation. Others have drawn connections to design and critical systems heuristics.

Practice and application

Biology

Many early cyberneticians worked in neurophysiology, including Grey Walter, Warren McCulloch, and Arturo Rosenbluth. This remained a focus as cybernetics developed. Other applications of cybernetics in biology include the physicist George Gamow's article in Scientific American called "Information transfer in the living cell", and biologists Jacques Monod and François Jacob use of cybernetics as a language for formulating their early theory of gene regulatory networks in the 1960s. The theory of autopoiesis, was developed by Humberto Maturana and Francisco Varela in the 1970s.

Creative arts

As a transdisciplinary field, cybernetics has included and influenced work in the creative arts.

The prominent and influential Cybernetic Serendipity exhibition was held at the Institute of Contemporary Arts in 1968 curated by Jasia Reichardt, explored relationships between art and computing. Works included Nicholas Schöffer's CYSP I and Gordon Pask's Colloquy of Mobiles installation. Pask's reflections on Colloquy connected it to his earlier Musicolour installation and to what he termed "aesthetically potent environments", a concept that connected this artistic work to his concerns with teaching and learning.

The artist Roy Ascott elaborated an extensive theory of cybernetic art in  "Behaviourist Art and the Cybernetic Vision".

Composer Herbert Brün participated in the Biological Computer Laboratory and was later involved in the founding of the School for Designing a Society, a project of teachers, performers, artists, and activists, influenced by cybernetics, where the question "What would I consider a desirable society?" is given serious playful thoughtful discussion. A premise of the school was that social change can be realized in a transformation from the current to a new society (a change of system), not only in improvements to the current society (changes in a system).

Others in the creative arts who are associated with cybernetics include Brian Eno, Ruairi Glynn, Pauline Oliveros, Tom Scholte, and Stephen Willats.

Design cybernetics

Cybernetics was an influence on thinking in design in the decades after the Second World War. Ashby and Pask were drawn on by design theorists such as Horst Rittel, Christopher Alexander and Bruce Archer. Later figures include Ranulph Glanville, Klaus Krippendorff, and Annetta Pedretti.

Cybernetics has been influential in architecture, especially through the work of Gordon Pask. Pask collaborated with architect Cedric Price and theatre director Joan Littlewood on the influential Fun Palace project during the 1960s and became a consultant to Nicholas Negroponte's Architecture Machine Group, forerunner of the MIT Media Lab. Pask's 1950s Musicolour installation was the inspiration for John and Julia Frazer's work on Price's Generator project.

Architects influenced by cybernetics include Lebbeus Woods and Neil Spiller.

The cybernetic study of design has continued to contribute to design methods and design research and to the development of systemic design and metadesign practices.

Management and organisational cybernetics

Management cybernetics is concerned with the application of cybernetics to management and organizations, developed by Stafford Beer from the late 1950s. It is focused on various mechanisms of self-regulation applied by and to organizational settings. Beer developed two influential methodologies, the viable system model and syntegration. In Project Cybersyn, Beer used the viable system model in the context of economy at large scale, in Chile under Salvador Allende during the early 1970s.

Perceptual control theory

Beginning in the 1950s, William T. Powers applied the concepts and methods of engineered control systems to biological control systems, and developed the experimental methodology of perceptual control theory (PCT), a model of behavior based on the properties of negative feedback (cybernetic) control loops. A key insight of PCT is that the controlled variable is not the output of the system (the behavioral actions), but its input, that is, a sensed and transformed function of some state of the environment that the control system's output can affect. Because these sensed and transformed inputs may appear as consciously perceived aspects of the environment, Powers labelled the controlled variable "perception". The theory came to be known as "perceptual control theory" to distinguish from those control theorists that assert or assume that it is the system's output that is controlled.

Psychotherapy

The development of family therapy was significantly influenced by cybernetics through the work of Gregory Bateson, as was the work of R. D. Laing and his work Knots.

The method of levels is an approach to psychotherapy based on perceptual control theory where the therapist aims to help the patient shift their awareness to higher levels of perception in order to resolve conflicts and allow reorganization to take place.

Social and behavioural sciences

As cybernetics developed, its influence spread within the social sciences. Anthropologists Bateson and Mead had already been prominent during the Macy conferences. Concepts from cybernetics spread throughout psychology from the 1950s onwards. The psychological theory of reversal theory was rooted in cybernetics and continues to be the basis of research and practice. Niklas Luhmann's social systems theory draw on ideas from cybernetics such as autopoiesis.

Technology

Early focuses included relations between biology and technology, such as in parallels between volitional movement through the nervous system and servo-mechanisms in engineering and early ideas of computers of electronic brains. Cybernetics remains closely associated with technological applications, especially where these are informed by living systems. Neural networks, an early focus of cybernetics from the 1940s, has seen renewed applications in artificial intelligence and machine learning in the C21st.

Related fields
Cybernetics' broad scope and tendency to transgress disciplinary norms means its own boundaries have shifted over time and can be difficult to define.

Cybernetics is often understood within the context of systems science, systems theory, and systems thinking. Systems approaches influenced by cybernetics include:
 Critical systems thinking, which incorporates the Viable System Model from the work of Stafford Beer.
 Systemic design, which has drawn on the work of cyberneticians Ranulph Glanville, Klaus Krippendorff, and Paul Pangaro.
 System dynamics, which is based on the concept of causal feedback loops.

Many fields trace their origins in whole or part to work carried out in cybernetics, or were partially absorbed into cybernetics when it was developed. These include artificial intelligence, bionics, cognitive science, control theory, complexity science, computer science, information theory and robotics.

Journals and societies

Academic journals with focuses in cybernetics include:
 Constructivist Foundations
 Cybernetics and Human Knowing
 Cybernetics and Systems
 IEEE Transactions on Systems, Man, and Cybernetics: Systems
 IEEE Transactions on Human-Machine Systems
 IEEE Transactions on Cybernetics
 IEEE Transactions on Computational Social Systems
 Kybernetes
Academic societies primarily concerned with cybernetics or aspects of it include:
American Society for Cybernetics
Cybernetics Society
IEEE Systems, Man, and Cybernetics Society
Metaphorum: The Metaphorum group was set up in 2003 to develop Stafford Beer's legacy in Organizational Cybernetics. The Metaphorum Group was born in a Syntegration in 2003 and have every year after developed a Conference on issues related to Organizational Cybernetics' theory and practice.
RC51 Sociocybernetics: RC51 is a research committee of the International Sociological Association promoting the development of (socio)cybernetic theory and research within the social sciences.
SCiO (Systems and Complexity in Organisation) is a community of systems practitioners who believe that traditional approaches to running organisations are no longer capable of dealing with the complexity and turbulence faced by organisations today and are responsible for many of the problems we see today. SCiO delivers an apprenticeship on masters level and a certification in systems practice.

See also

Further reading 

 
 
 Ascott, Roy (1967). Behaviourist Art and the Cybernetic Vision. Cybernetica, Journal of the International Association for Cybernetics (Namur), 10, pp. 25–56
 
 
 François, Charles (1999). "Systemics and cybernetics in a historical perspective". In: Systems Research and Behavioral Science. Vol 16, pp. 203–219 (1999)
 
 
 
 
 Heylighen, Francis, and Cliff Joslyn (2002). "Cybernetics and Second Order Cybernetics", in: R.A. Meyers (ed.), Encyclopedia of Physical Science & Technology (3rd ed.), Vol. 4, (Academic Press, San Diego), p. 155-169.
 Hyötyniemi, Heikki (2006). Neocybernetics in Biological Systems. Espoo: Helsinki University of Technology, Control Engineering Laboratory.
 Ilgauds, Hans Joachim (1980), Norbert Wiener, Leipzig.
 
 
 
 
 
 
 
 Umpleby, Stuart (1989). "The science of cybernetics and the cybernetics of science", in: ''Cybernetics and Systems", Vol. 21, No. 1, (1990), pp. 109–121.
 von Foerster, Heinz, (1995), Ethics and Second-Order Cybernetics.

Notes

References

External links 

 General
 Norbert Wiener and Stefan Odobleja - A Comparative Analysis
 Reading List for Cybernetics 
 Principia Cybernetica Web
 Web Dictionary of Cybernetics and Systems
 Glossary Slideshow (136 slides) 
 
 

 Societies
 American Society for Cybernetics
 IEEE Systems, Man, & Cybernetics Society
  International Society for Cybernetics and Systems Research
 The Cybernetics Society

 
Transhumanism